Petriola is a genus of air-breathing land snails, terrestrial pulmonate gastropod molluscs in the subfamily Petriolinae  of the family Achatinidae.

Species
 Petriola anjouanensis (Pilsbry, 1909)
 Petriola clavus (L. Pfeiffer, 1846)
 Petriola comorensis (L. Pfeiffer, 1856)
 Petriola marmorea (Reeve, 1850)
 Petriola monacha (Morelet, 1886)
 Petriola monticola (Morelet, 1866)
 Petriola simpularia (Morelet, 1851)

References

External links

  Dall, W. H. (1905). Note on Trichodina Ancey. The Nautilus. 18(12): 143.
 Ancey, C. F. (1888). Catalogue des mollusques terrestres et fluviatiles récoltés sur la côte occidentale d'Afrique par M. le Cap. Vignon d'après un manuscrit de ce dernier, avec des remarques sur ces espèces. Bulletins de la Société Malacologique de France. 5: 65-76

Gastropod genera